A regional park, in Quebec, is an area designated by a regional county municipality (MRC) or equivalent territory for the purposes of recreation and of nature conservation.

While National Parks of Quebec are dedicated to conservation and education in environmental protection, regional parks, although they can take on a preservation dimension, allow the practice of activities recreational, commercial and resource development.

Features 
In order to establish a regional park, a  must adopt a by-law which determines the base of the park. The by-law has no effect on private property as long as the municipality does not own it. However, the regulation gives it the power to enter into an agreement with the holder of a property right within the limits of the established park, and to establish a right of preemption or even a right of supervision over the improvements that an owner brings to his buildings.

The  which has designated a territory as being a regional park may, within its limits, regulate:
 the administration and operation of the park
 protection and nature conservation;
 the security of users;
 the use or the parking of vehicles;
 the possession and care of domestic animals;
 the display;
 the operation of shops;
 the exercise of recreational activities;
 any use of a public road not governed by the Highway Safety Code.

The  may operate the commercial, recreational and lodging activities itself within the park boundaries or entrust them to a third party.

Designation 
The legislative framework governing the parks does not provide for a controlled designation. The law provides for a  procedure to create a park, but does not govern the use of the designation “regional park”; it is neither compulsory nor regulated. Thus, the Association of regional parks of Quebec claims between 150 and 175 regional parks, while the Ministry of Municipal Affairs recognizes the existence of 17 of these territories.

List of regional parks 
Only 17 parks are registered in a land use planning and development plan and recognized by the Ministry of Municipal Affairs:

Montréal 

Jurisdiction over intermunicipal parks is vested in the Montreal Urban Community (CUM) since its creation in 1969.

In addition, the  declared its exclusive jurisdiction over regional parks on its territory as of 1979. The same year, the metropolitan organization began acquiring green spaces: the Cap Saint-Jacques, the Bois de Liesse and de Saraguay, the Île de la Visitation, and the Pointe aux Trembles.

Montérégie
 Beauharnois-Salaberry Regional Park (Beauharnois-Salaberry, Montérégie)
 Des Grèves Regional Park (Marguerite-D'Youville)

North
 Boréal (Manicouagan, Côte-Nord)
 Cap Jaseux Aventures (Le Fjord-du-Saguenay, Saguenay–Lac-Saint-Jean)
 Obalski Regional Park (Chibougamau, Nord-du-Québec)

North-East
 Seigneurie-du-lac-Matapédia Regional Park (La Matapédia, Bas-Saint-Laurent)
 Canyon Portes de l'Enfer (TERFA) (Rimouski-Neigette, Bas-Saint-Laurent)
 Mont-Saint-Joseph Regional Park (Avignon, Gaspésie–Îles-de-la-Madeleine)
 Gros Cap Park (Les Îles-de-la-Madeleine)

East
 Parc de la Gorge (Coaticook)
 Grandes-Coulées Regional Park (L'Érable, Centre-du-Québec)
 Rivière-Gentilly Regional Park (Bécancour, Centre-du-Québec)
 Parc régional du Marécage-des-Scots (Le Haut-Saint-François)
 Parc régional du Mont-Ham (Les Sources, Centre-du-Québec)

Quebec Region
 Parc régional du Massif-du-Sud (Bellechasse, Les Etchemins)
 Vallée Bras-du-Nord (Portneuf)
 Parc naturel régional de Portneuf (Portneuf)
 Sainte-Anne, Canyon (La Côte-de-Beaupré, Capitale-Nationale)
 Sainte-Foy, Base de Plein Air (Quebec, Capitale-Nationale)
 Parc régional des Appalaches (Montmagny, Chaudière-Appalaches)

Central 
 Centre de la côte Boisée-Groupe Plein Air Terrebonne (Les Moulins, Lanaudière)
 Parc régional de la Chute-à-Bull (Matawinie)
 Lac Taureau (Matawinie)
 Ouareau Forest Regional Park (Matawinie)
 Sept-Chutes (Matawinie, Lanaudière)
 Parc de la Rivière-Batiscan (Les Chenaux, Mauricie)
 Parc de Trois-Sœurs (La Tuque, Mauricie)

Laurentides
 Rivière-des-Mille-Îles (Thérèse-De Blainville, Laurentides; and Laval)
 Bois de Belle-Rivière; et P'tit Train du Nord (Laurentides)
 Rivière-du-Nord (La Rivière-du-Nord)
 Réservoir Kiamika; Montagne-du-Diable; et Poisson-Blanc (Antoine-Labelle)
 Parc d'Escalage et de Randonnée de la Montagne d'Argent; et Val-David - Val-Morin (Les Laurentides)

See also 
 Regional nature parks of France
 Natural Park of Belgium
 National Parks of Quebec

References 

Regional Parks of Quebec
Parks in Quebec